Thomas Usher Pearson (6 March 1913 – 2 March 1999) was a Scottish professional football player and manager.

Playing career

Born in Edinburgh, Pearson played for Murrayfield Amateurs, and had a trial for Heart of Midlothian, but signed professional terms with Newcastle United in March 1933. He played over 200 games for Newcastle before and after the Second World War, scoring a total of 52 goals. Pearson was renowned as a skilful and entertaining outside-left, although he won no major honours at St James' Park.

Pearson made a guest appearance for England during a wartime international against Scotland in Newcastle when outside left Eric Brook was injured before the game. Pearson was at the match as a spectator, but agreed to turn out for England. He was capped twice by Scotland in 1947, which uniquely meant that he had played for both Scotland and England.

In 1948, he was signed by Aberdeen for £4,000, and quickly became a crowd favourite, renowned particularly for his 'double shuffle', which baffled opposing players and spectators alike. Pearson retired at the age of 40, and took up a career as a sports writer, often covering Aberdeen for the Scottish Daily Mail.

Managerial career
In November 1959, Pearson was appointed manager of Aberdeen, in spite of his lack of coaching or managerial experience, and the six years he had spent outside the game, albeit as an observer. Unusually, his predecessor, Davie Shaw stayed on at the club in his former capacity as coach. Pearson's time in office coincided with the departure or retirement of a number of key players, and long-term injuries to others, alleviated only briefly by the emergence of Charlie Cooke, soon on his way to Chelsea. There were a sequence of Scottish Cup exits to lower league teams, and in spite of a Summer Cup final, ultimately lost to Hibs in 1964, Pearson's reign ended with his resignation on 13 February 1965.

References

External links

1913 births
1999 deaths
Footballers from Edinburgh
Scottish footballers
Aberdeen F.C. players
Newcastle United F.C. players
Stoke City F.C. wartime guest players
Scotland international footballers
England wartime international footballers
Scotland wartime international footballers
Scottish football managers
Aberdeen F.C. managers
Scottish Football League players
Scottish Football League representative players
English Football League players
Scottish Football League managers
English Football League representative players
Association football outside forwards
Royal Air Force personnel of World War II